Adriano Rodrigues da Silva (born 8 December 1978), sometimes known as Adriano Cabeça or just Adriano, is a Brazilian football coach and former player who played as a defensive midfielder. He is the current head coach of Cruzeiro de Arapiraca.

Playing career
Born in Maceió, Adriano played exclusively in his native state Alagoas during his entire career.

In 2004, Adriano joined CSA, and appeared for the club in the Campeonato Alagoano Segunda Divisão. In 2005 he moved to Bandeirante, and returned to Bom Jesus for the 2006 season.

Adriano helped Igaci to win the second division of the Alagoano in 2006, and subsequently became a regular starter for the side. He left the club in 2009 to join Penedense for the ensuing campaign, and played for Ipanema in 2011 before retiring.

Managerial career
After retiring, Adriano first worked as a manager at former side Sete de Setembro, leading the club in the campaigns of 2013 and 2014, in the second division. In 2015, he worked as an assistant manager of another former team, Ipanema, being also an interim manager. He subsequently returned to Sete, and helped the side to achieve promotion to the first division as champions.

Adriano resigned from Sete on 8 March 2016, but returned to the role for the 2017 campaign. In 2018, he was in charge of  before moving to ASA to work as their under-20 manager on 3 October 2019.

In November 2019, Adriano agreed to a deal with CSA to work as their under-20 manager in the ensuing campaign. He subsequently became an assistant manager of the main squad, and was an interim manager for a Série B match against Cruzeiro in September 2020, after the dismissal of Argel Fucks.

In April 2021, after manager Mozart left for Chapecoense, Adriano was named interim manager. He was also an interim on two occasions in 2022, after Alberto Valentim and Roberto Fernandes left.

On 14 November 2022, despite the club's relegation, Adriano was permanently named manager of CSA for the upcoming season. On 4 December, however, the club's new board announced his departure.

Honours

Player
Igaci
Campeonato Alagoano Segunda Divisão: 2006

Manager
Sete de Setembro
Campeonato Alagoano Segunda Divisão: 2015

References

External links

1978 births
Living people
People from Maceió
Sportspeople from Alagoas
Brazilian footballers
Association football midfielders
Campeonato Brasileiro Série C players
Agremiação Sportiva Arapiraquense players
Centro Sportivo Alagoano players
Ipanema Atlético Clube players
Brazilian football managers
Campeonato Brasileiro Série B managers
Centro Sportivo Alagoano managers